Pacha Kamaq (Quechua, "Creator of the World"; also Pacha Camac, Pachacamac  and Pacharurac) was the deity worshipped in the city of Pachacamac (modern-day Peru) by the Ichma.

Pacha Kamaq was believed to have created the first man and woman, but forgot to give them food and the man died. The woman cursed Pacha Kamaq, accusing him of neglect, and Pacha Kamaq made her fertile. Later Pacha Kamaq killed her son and cut the corpse into pieces, each of which became a separate fruit or vegetable plant.  The woman's second son, Wichama, escaped, so Pacha Kamaq killed the woman.  Wichama sought revenge and drove Pacha Kamaq into the ocean.

Tahuantinsuyu adopted Pacha Kamaq when they incorporated the Ichma into their empire. In late Inca mythology he was the father of Inti and Mama Killa, and husband of Mama Pacha. The Wari, the Pachacamac empire, Chancay, Chimor and Ichma possessed the city of Pachacamac at some point but it is unknown if any other peoples, apart from the Ichma, worshipped the Pacha Kamaq deity.

See also
Inca mythology
Pachacamac

References

External links
Lanning, Edward P., Peru before the Incas

Peruvian culture
Creator gods
Inca gods
Legendary progenitors